Dollungmukh is a circle in the Lower Subansiri of Arunachal Pradesh, India Its name means "land of two river mouths", referring to the Dollung and the Subansiri. The inhabitants are Nyishi.

References
 

Regions of India
Kamle district